Timber Terrors is a 1935 Western film directed by Robert Emmett Tansey and starring John Preston, William Desmond and Tom London.

Plot
Sgt. Morton and Cpl, Anderson are sent to find the murderer of another Mountie.

Cast
 John Preston as Mountie Sergeant Bruce Morton
 Myrla Bratton as Mildred Boynton
 William Desmond as Royce Horter
 Tom London as Burke
 Harold Berquist as Simpson 
 Fred Parker as Old Dan Parker
 James Sheridan as Billy Boynton 
 Tiny Skelton as Mountie Corporal Tiny Anderson
 Dynamite the Horse as Dynamite 
 Captain, King of Dogs as Captain

References

Bibliography
 Michael R. Pitts. Poverty Row Studios, 1929–1940: An Illustrated History of 55 Independent Film Companies, with a Filmography for Each. McFarland & Company, 2005.

External links
 

1935 films
1935 Western (genre) films
1930s English-language films
American Western (genre) films
Films directed by Robert Emmett Tansey
American black-and-white films
Royal Canadian Mounted Police in fiction
1930s American films